Allan Mohideen (born 11 November 1993) is an Iraqi professional footballer who plays as a right back for Utsiktens BK.

Club career

Örgryte IS
Mohideen signed with Örgryte IS in August 2017, and left the club again on 19 November 2018. Later he confirmed, that Örgryte wanted to keep him, but he said that he didn't feel like it was the right step for him. He then moved to Marbella in Spain, where he began a civil career as a broker, but also as an advisor and a consultant where he help people, many Swedes among other things, invest money in housing projects.

International career
Mohideen was raised in Sweden to an Iraqi-Kurdish father and a Romanian mother. He debuted for the Iraq national football team in a friendly 2–1 loss against Qatar.

See also
 List of Iraq international footballers

References

External links

 
 

1993 births
Living people
Footballers from Gothenburg
Iraqi footballers
Iraq international footballers
Swedish footballers
Iraqi Kurdish people
Iraqi people of Romanian descent
Swedish people of Iraqi descent
Swedish people of Romanian descent
Swedish people of Kurdish descent
Association football defenders
Utsiktens BK players
IFK Göteborg players
Qviding FIF players
Ljungskile SK players
GAIS players
Örgryte IS players
Superettan players